Mersin İdmanyurdu (also Mersin İdman Yurdu, Mersin İY, or MİY) Sports Club; located in Mersin, east Mediterranean coast of Turkey in 1998–99. Mersin İdmanyurdu (MİY) participated in 1998–99 Second League season for the 25th time. MİY couldn't attend promotion group but had finished classification in the first place and attended promotion play-offs, but couldn't promote. Team also participated in Turkish Cup in 1998–99 and eliminated at Round 2.

Mehmet Küver was club president. Müjdat Yalman managed the team in the first half. In the second half Kahraman Karataş was head coach. Oğuzhan Doğar appeared in all league games. In total Gökhan Sakar share the most appearance with 32 appearances. Gökhan Sakar was also league and season top goalscorer.

1998–99 Second League participation
Mersin İdmanyurdu took place in Group 1 in 1998–99 Second League season. League was played in three stages. In the first stage 50 teams in five groups (10 clubs in each) played for first two rankings to play in promotion group. The promotion group consisted of those 10 teams. At the end of the second stage top two teams promoted to 1999–00 First League. Remaining 8 teams in each ranking group played in classification groups, by carrying points and goals from ranking groups. Bottom two teams relegated to 1999–00 Third League at the end of the season. In the third stage, 8 clubs (3 from the promotion group and 1 each from 5 classification groups) played one-leg play-off games in Antalya Atatürk Stadium to determine the third team to be promoted to First League.

Mersin İdmanyurdu took place in Group 1 consisted of 10 teams and finished first stage at third place and couldn't took place in promotion group. In classification group, team finished at top and attended to promotion play-off games but eliminated at first round (quarter finals).

Results summary
Mersin İdmanyurdu (MİY) 1998–99 Second League season league summary:

Sources: 1998–99 Turkish Second Football League pages.

Ranking group league table
Mersin İY's league performance in TFF Second League Ranking Group 1 in 1998–99 season is shown in the following table.

Three points for a win. Rules for classification: 1) points; 2) tie-break; 3) goal difference; 4) number of goals scored. In the score columns first scores belong to MİY.
 (Q): Qualified to 1998–99 Second League Promotion Group.Source: 1998–99 Turkish Second Football League pages from TFF website, Turkish-Soccer website, and Maçkolik website.

Ranking group games
Mersin İdmanyurdu (MİY) 1998–99 Second League season first half game reports in Ranking Group 1 is shown in the following table.
Kick off times are in EET and EEST.

Sources: 1998–99 Turkish Second Football League pages.

Classification group league table
Classification group 1 was played with 8 teams remaining after top two of ranking group were promoted to promotion group. Top team in the group promoted to promotion play-offs, while bottom two teams relegated to 1998–99 Third League season. Points and goals were carried from ranking group. MİY obtained 6 wins, 3 draws and 5 losses and finished fourth. However,  because points and goals were carried from ranking group, in aggregate MİY finished first and became eligible to play promotion play-offs. Mersin İY's league performance in Second League Classification Group 1 in 1998–99 season is shown in the following table.

Three points for a win. Rules for classification: 1) points; 2) tie-break; 3) goal difference; 4) number of goals scored. In the score columns first scores belong to MİY.
 (Q): Qualified to 1998–99 Promotion Play-offs;  (R): Relegated to 1999–2000 Turkish Third Football League.Source: 1998–99 Turkish Second Football League pages from TFF website, Turkish-Soccer website, and Maçkolik website.

Classification group games
Mersin İdmanyurdu (MİY) 1998–99 Second League season first half game reports in Classification Group 1 is shown in the following table.
Kick off times are in EET and EEST.

Sources: 1998–99 Turkish Second Football League pages.

Promotion play-offs
Five classification group winners and the teams who took 3rd, 4th and 5th places in promotion group played promotion play-offs at a neutral venue. Play-offs played in one-leg elimination system in Antalya between 24–30 May 1997. In quarter finals Mersin İdmanyurdu was eliminated by Çaykur Rizespor who finished Promotion Group at fifth place. Later Kartalspor has been eliminated by Göztepe at finals and Promotion Group second runners-up Göztepe won play-offs.

Game details:

Source: 1998–99 Turkish Second Football League Promotion Play-offs pages.

1998–99 Turkish Cup participation
1998–99 Turkish Cup was played by 90 teams in 6 rounds prior to quarterfinals. First five round were played in one-leg elimination system, starting from 6th round two leg elimination rounds were played. [Mersin İdmanyurdu] had participated in 37th Turkish Cup (played as Türkiye Kupası in 1998–99) at Round 2 and eliminated. The opponents Hatayspor were from Second League like MİY. Previous year Hatayspor was the team to which MİY had lost in 4th round. Galatasaray won the cup for the 12th time.

Cup track
The drawings and results Mersin İdmanyurdu (MİY) followed in 1998–99 Turkish Cup are shown in the following table.

Note: In the above table 'Score' shows For and Against goals whether the match played at home or not.

Game details
Mersin İdmanyurdu (MİY) 1998–99 Turkish Cup game reports is shown in the following table.
Kick off times are in EET and EEST.

Source: 1998–99 Turkish Cup pages.

Management

Club management
Municipality official Mehmet Küver was president of the club at the start of the season. Halil Kuriş was acting mayor of Mersin city. However, on 18 April 1999 local elections were held in Turkey, and mayor of the city changed. Macit Özcan won the elections in Mersin. Mayors presided the club many times in its history and Özcan elected president in club congress.

Coaching team
Müjdat Yalman was head coach at the first half of the season. Kahraman Karataş came to the position before the start of the second stage and completed the season.

1998–99 Mersin İdmanyurdu head coaches:

Note: Only official games were included.

1998–99 squad
Appearances, goals and cards count for 1998–99 Second League Ranking and Classification Groups games, promotion play-offs QF game and 1998–99 Turkish Cup. 18 players appeared in each game roster, three to be replaced. Players who only appeared in game rosters were included and listed in order of appearance.

Sources: TFF club page and maçkolik team page.

See also
 Football in Turkey
 1998–99 Turkish Second Football League
 1998–99 Turkish Cup

Notes and references

Mersin İdman Yurdu seasons
Turkish football clubs 1998–99 season